The Sleeping Tiger is a 1954 British film noir directed by Joseph Losey and starring Alexis Smith, Dirk Bogarde and Alexander Knox. It was Losey's first British feature, which he directed under the pseudonym of Victor Hanbury due to being blacklisted in the McCarthy Era. It was shot at Walton Studios and on location in London. The film's sets were designed by the art director John Stoll. It was released by Anglo-Amalgamated while in America it was distributed by Astor Pictures.

Plot
Two criminals are stalking the streets of London one dark night. Frank Clemmons (Dirk Bogarde), a cocky middle-class young man, holds up psychiatrist Dr. Clive Esmond (Alexander Knox) at gunpoint outside his affluent home, but Dr. Esmond overpowers him.

Arriving home from in Paris, Dr. Esmond's wife Glenda (Alexis Smith) is taken aback to discover Clemmons staying in their home as the new household guest. To avoid being turned over to the police, Frank agreed to stay as a guest at Dr. Esmond's house as a human guinea-pig subjected to Dr. Esmond's psychoanalysis, which aims to release him from his criminal recidivism. Glenda has reservations about Frank and behaves in a cold, aloof manner towards him.

Frank undergoes regular analysis with Dr. Esmond, who is determined to get to the root of his criminality. In between these sessions, he goes horse riding with Glenda. Although at first indifferent to him, Glenda soon finds herself growing attracted to Frank. With a fellow criminal in tow, Frank leaves the house one night and steals some jewellery. A police inspector later interviews him about the crime, but he denies having committed it. Some time after, Frank takes Glenda to the Metro, a hipster nightclub in Soho where her conflicted attraction to him deepens. The next day Glenda admonishes Frank for his violent behaviour towards the house-maid Sally (Patricia McCarron), but their argument ends with a passionate clinch which indicates the beginning of an affair between Glenda and Frank.

Initially oblivious, Dr. Esmond eventually finds Frank and his wife in a compromising position. Glenda's conflicted feelings plague her. Back at the Metro club with Frank, the two have a huge argument that overwhelms her. As they begin their journey home, Glenda driving recklessly and out of control. A police car soon pursues them but they manage to escape.

Sally's fiancé pays Dr. Esmond a visit to complain about the abuse she has had to endure from Frank. Her fiancé threatens to tell the police about the assault. No charges are pressed and Frank finds out that this is due to Dr. Esmond buying the man off with £100. Frank reacts by carrying out another robbery. When questioned by the police, Dr. Esmond ends up lying on Frank's behalf. A cunning ploy, this results in Frank pouring out a dramatic account of his tyrannical father, whom he deeply despised. As a boy, Frank stole and his father consequently turned him in to the authorities. Frank vowed revenge on his Father when he was released, but was then given a beating. His father died shortly thereafter and his mother blamed him. Frank admits that he prayed for his father's death, and has seen himself as worthy of punishment ever since. Dr. Esmond concludes that with the father's death, Frank has had to provide his own punishment for the rest of his life.

Dr. Esmond soon begins acting like a father figure towards Frank. The two enjoy carefree activities together until Glenda finds out and grows intensely jealous. She asks Frank to elope with her. However, with Dr. Esmond's psychiatric experiment over and his patterns of behaviour understood, Frank leaves and decides to turn himself in to the police. Glenda hysterically rushes to Dr. Esmond, claiming that Frank has assaulted her. Dr. Esmond goes upstairs with a gun and returns claiming that he has shot Frank dead. Glenda is heartbroken and ends up declaring her love for Frank. She then finds out that though there was a gunshot, Frank has escaped and she goes after him in her car. Frank gets into Glenda's car and they drive off at high speed. The highly distressed Glenda swerves to avoid a lorry, but crashes. Frank survives, but Glenda dies in the wreckage.

Cast
 Dirk Bogarde as Frank Clemmons 
 Alexis Smith as Glenda Esmond
 Alexander Knox as Dr. Clive Esmond
 Hugh Griffith as The Inspector 
 Patricia McCarron as Sally Foster, maid
 Maxine Audley as Carol
 Glyn Houston as Bailey
 Harry Towb as Harry, second criminal (uncredited)
 Russell Waters as Manager of Pearce & Mann
 Billie Whitelaw as Receptionist at Pearce & Mann
 Fred Griffiths as Taxi Driver
 Esma Cannon as Cleaner with ladder

Production notes
Due to his alleged ties with the US Communist Party, the blacklisted Joseph Losey moved to London and began work on The Sleeping Tiger, his first British feature film. Despite being in England, he faced more problems. The British director Victor Hanbury, who had not directed a film since Hotel Reserve in 1944, allowed Losey to use Hanbury's name as an alias. The American stars, Alexis Smith and Alexander Knox, were fearful of how appearing in Losey's film would affect their Hollywood careers.

The Sleeping Tiger was the beginning of Losey's partnership with Dirk Bogarde, whom he later directed in The Servant, King & Country, Modesty Blaise and Accident, and with editor Reginald Mills who edited The Servant and King & Country.

Reception
According to Kinematograph Weekly the film was a "money maker" at the British box office in 1954.

References

External links
 
 
 
 
 The Sleeping Tiger at BFI Screenonline

1954 films
British black-and-white films
British crime films
Film noir
Films based on British novels
Films directed by Joseph Losey
Films with screenplays by Carl Foreman
Films scored by Malcolm Arnold
Films set in London
Films shot in London
Films shot at Nettlefold Studios
1950s English-language films
Astor Pictures films
1954 crime films
1950s British films
Films about psychiatry